The 21st G7 summit was held on June 15–17, 1995 in Halifax, Nova Scotia, Canada. The venue for this summit meeting was Summit Place in Halifax. It was labelled by Prime Minister Jean Chrétien as a "Chevrolet Summit", using a utilitarian automobile as a metaphor for the summit being less expensive than previous summits in Versailles and Venice.

The Group of Seven (G7) is an unofficial forum which brought together the heads of the richest industrialized countries: France, Germany, Italy, Japan, the United Kingdom, the United States, Canada (since 1976), and the President of the European Commission (starting officially in 1981). The summits were not meant to be linked formally with wider international institutions; and in fact, a mild rebellion against the stiff formality of other international meetings was a part of the genesis of cooperation between France's president Valéry Giscard d'Estaing and West Germany's chancellor Helmut Schmidt as they conceived the first Group of Six (G6) summit in 1975.

Leaders at the summit
The G7 is an unofficial annual forum for the leaders of Canada, the European Commission, France, Germany, Italy, Japan, the United Kingdom, and the United States. Boris Yeltsin was also in attendance representing Russia.

The 21st G7 summit was the first summit for French President Jacques Chirac and the last summit for Japanese Prime Minister Tomiichi Murayama. It was also the first and only summit for Italian Prime Minister Lamberto Dini.

Participants

These summit participants are the current "core members" of the international forum:

Issues
The summit was intended as a venue for resolving differences among its members. As a practical matter, the summit was also conceived as an opportunity for its members to give each other mutual encouragement in the face of difficult economic decisions. Issues which were discussed at this summit included:
 Growth and Employment
 Meeting the Challenges of the 21st Century
 Strengthening the Global Economy
 Promoting Sustainable Development
 Reducing Poverty
 Safeguarding the Environment
 Preventing and Responding to Crises
 Reinforcing Coherence, Effectiveness and Efficiency of Institutions
 Creating Opportunities through Open Markets
 Economies in Transition
 Nuclear Safety

Accomplishments
This was the first year that the G8 summit was marked by an official World Wide Web site on the Internet sponsored by the Canadian Government. Two unofficial web pages were also created, one set up by Dalhousie University in Halifax, the summit site, and the other created by teachers and students of Cornwallis Junior High School there.

Gallery

See also
 G8

Notes

References
 Bayne, Nicholas and Robert D. Putnam. (2000).  Hanging in There: The G7 and G8 Summit in Maturity and Renewal. Aldershot, Hampshire, England: Ashgate Publishing. ; OCLC 43186692
 Reinalda, Bob and Bertjan Verbeek. (1998).  Autonomous Policy Making by International Organizations. London: Routledge.  ; ;   OCLC 39013643

External links

 Official G8 website: Halifax summit, 1995; n.b., no official website is created for any G7 summit prior to 1995.
 University of Toronto: G8 Research Group, G8 Information Centre
  G7 1995, delegations & documents

G7 summit
G7 summit
1995 in international relations
G7 summit 1995
G7 summit 1995
1995
G7 summit 1995
June 1995 events in Canada